John Baptist Moraes (1933 – 30 December 2014) was a Konkani poet and writer.

Jonh Baptist Moraes was born in 1933 in a village called Kallamundkur (also known as Niddodi) near Mangalore. Mr. Moraes received the Sahitya Akademi Award for his collection of Konkani poems Bhitorlem Tufan in 1985. He was the first Konkani writer from Karnataka to receive this Award.  He received Maharashtra Gaurav Puraskar in 1990 and Sandesha Prathistan Literary Award in the year 2000. He has written a monograph of the great Konkani poet C.F. DeCosta for the Sahitya Akademi under the series 'Makers of Indian Literature'. He has also translated History of Kannada Literature for Sahitya Akademi. As a journalist, Mr. Moraes has a long experience of over 45 years in working with the various Konkani periodicals.

Mr. Moraes was elected President of the 19th Session of the All India Konkani Parishad held in Madgaon in January 1993. Mr. Moraes was an instrumental in reviving the oldest representative body of Konkanis "Konkani Bhasha Mandal, Mumbai’, in 1992.  He was its General Secretary since 1992. He was a member of the General Council and Konkani Advisory Board of the Sahitya Akademi. He was also Convener of the Konkani Advisory Committee of the Bharatiya Jnanpith.

Moraes died 30 December 2014 aged 81.

Poetry
NOVI VHOKAL, 1977
BHITORLEM TUFAN, 1984
EK DHENT, EK PAAN, 2002

Short stories
KOSHEDDAN KELLI
KHUN, 1980

Biography
GEORGE FERNANDES, 1999

Plays
SOPANN-PARKI ZUZE, 2002

Verse
PUTIPHARACHI BAIL, 1990

Life sketches
MONGLLURCHIM UJWAL
RATNA, 1983

Monograph
CH FRA DeCOSTA, 2001

Translations into Konkani
ROMEO-JULIET,1954 (Play)
ONTYA NASHILLEM SOPANN,1975 (Novel)
NOVEM POINN, WOO1
KANNADA SAHITYACHO ITIHAS, 1989 (Literary History)

Adaptations
NISRALLEAK LOTUN GHALO,
1976 (NOVEL)
BOLPYAM MODHLI SHELI,
1977 (Novel)
ZORLO GOMES, 1987
(Sherlock Holmes Stories)

Serialized epic poem
DIVYAMRUT, 1989

In English collaboration
HISTORY OF KONKANI LITERATURE, 2000

Contributions of articles
MASTERPIECES OF INDIAN LITERATURE, 1997

References

1933 births
2014 deaths
Indian male poets
Recipients of the Sahitya Akademi Award in Konkani
Konkani-language poets
20th-century Indian poets
People from Dakshina Kannada district
Poets from Karnataka
20th-century Indian male writers